Muhammad Dilawar is a Pakistani politician who had been a Member of the Provincial Assembly of Sindh, from May 2013 to May 2018.

Early life and education
He was born on 1 January 1960 in Karachi.

He has a degree of Bachelor of Arts from Federal Urdu University and a degree of Bachelor of Laws from Karachi University.

Political career

He was elected to the Provincial Assembly of Sindh as a candidate of Mutahida Quami Movement from Constituency PS-110 KARACHI-XXII in 2013 Pakistani general election.

References

Living people
Sindh MPAs 2013–2018
1960 births
Muttahida Qaumi Movement politicians
Federal Urdu University alumni
University of Karachi alumni